The Libertarian Party of Manitoba ran six candidates in the 1999 provincial election, none of whom were elected.  Some of these candidates have their own biography pages; information about others may be found on this page.

Cameron Neumann (Elmwood)

Neumann received 320 votes (3.89%), finishing third against New Democratic Party incumbent Jim Maloway.

Footnotes

1999